"Baby" is a song by Aya Nakamura. It was released on 12 January 2023.

Charts

Certifications

References 

 

 
2023 songs
2023 singles
Aya Nakamura songs